Lizard Boy: The Musical is an indie-rock musical with book, lyrics and music by Justin Huertas. The musical follows the story of Trevor, a young man who has lizard scales for skin as he embarks on his first date in a year but winds up finding out he has superpowers and in a fight for his life. The musical was inspired by works such as X-Men, Spider-Man and the 2006 musical Spring Awakening.

Productions

World Premiere 
Lizard Boy made its world premiere on 27 March 2015 at the Seattle Repertory Theatre. It was directed by Brandon Ivie and featured Justin Huertas as Trevor, William A. WIlliams as Cary and Kirsten "Kiki" deLohr Helland as Siren.

Other Productions 
The show has had three further runs with the same cast, one at the Divisionary Theatre in San Diego from 29 September 2016 to 6 November 2016 and another at the Mountain View Center for the Performing Arts in Silicon Valley from 9 October 2021 to 31 October 2021. This was followed by a run of the 60-min version of the show at the Hope Mill Theatre in Manchester, UK from 14 July 2022 to 27 July 2022  and at the Edinburgh Fringe Festival from 2 August 2022 to 28 August 2022. The alternate performers include Anthony Rickman as Trevor, Sophie Reid as Siren, and Alan Cammish a Cary.

The Know Theatre of Cincinnati performed the first licensed production without the original cast from 18 November 2022 to 11 December 2022. The cast consisted of Jaron Crawford as Trevor, Ian Timothy Forsgren as Cary, and Erin McCamley as Siren.

Off-Broadway 
The show will have its New York City premiere will be from 1 June 2023 to 1 July 2023 at Theatre Row on 42nd St. The show will be produced in conjunction with Prospect Theatre Company, directed by Brandon Ivie, and star the original cast from the Seattle Repertory Theatre production.

Plot 
Trevor, a young man with green lizard scales on his skin, sits in his room and laments a failed relationship, attributing the breakup to his scales ("Trevor's Song"). Tired, he takes a nap and dreams of a strange woman singing hauntingly to him ("Overture"). When he awakens, he decides to download Grindr and soon receives a message from a stranger named Cary ("4th and Vine"). He contemplates his life so far ("Things I Want") and decides to agree to meet Cary.

When he arrives at Cary's apartment, Cary immediately starts flirting with him. However, he accidentally assumes that Trevor's scales are a costume for "Monster Fest" (the festival the city is celebrating that day), causing Trevor to feel insulted and leave. Desperate for him to stay, Cary improvises a song ("Cary's Song") and is able to convince Trevor to come back to his apartment. In Cary's apartment, Trevor sees a magazine with the face of the "Dream Girl" on the cover.

The scene flashes forward to the "Dream Girl" (Siren) performing "A Terrible Ride". When she finishes her set, she goes backstage and a curious Trevor follows, leaving Cary alone. Starstruck, Trevor asks if he can perform a song for her and she agrees.

The scene returns to Cary's apartment where the two men share a drink. Cary, being new to town, asks what Monster Fest is. Trevor reluctantly explains that it is a celebration of the defeat of the dragon that terrorised the city 20 years ago ("Recess"). He also mentions that when said Dragon was decapitated, Trevor and five other children wound up covered in its blood, which caused the scales to develop on his skin.

The scene returns to the club, where Siren is impatiently asking Trevor to perform. Simultaneously, Cary's conversation with Trevor plays, and both Siren and Cary urge Trevor to sing. Feeling confident, he plays ("Another Part of Me"), causing both Siren and Cary to feel a sense of connection to him.

As Siren and Trevor talk, Siren realises who Trevor really is and explains that she too is one of 6 children involved in the dragon incident. She explains that all the children involved developed superpowers. She believes that the dragons will return and overrun the city this year and enlists Trevor's help in defeating them ("A Myth to Live By").

Trevor refuses, stating that he is powerless, and decides to leave and find Cary. Siren threatens to kill him to obtain his powers if he doesn't help her just like she did to all the other children. When Trevor still tries to leave, she stops him with her "siren song". Fighting hard, Trevor is able to break free and leave but Siren makes chase.

Trevor finds Cary at a diner, eating by himself. When he tries to apologise, Cary dismisses him confessing how betrayed he felt when Trevor left with no explanation. Trevor once again tries to apologise, this time stating his faults and confessing that he sincerely wants to be friends with Cary ("Things I Worry About"). Cary accepts his apology and they decide to continue their date at the park ("The Woah Song"). Trevor goes in to kiss Cary, but suddenly feels a sharp pain on his back.

When he goes to check, he realises that there is a spike on his back that cut Cary and sees that he also accidentally cut one of his own fingers off while checking. Cary gets a bit woozy at the sight of the blood. Trevor mistakes the reaction for disgust because of his appearance and accuses Cary of being shallow and leaves. As he goes Cary reminds Trevor that he's being just as judgemental as he assumes others are ("Truth is What Matters"). As Cary leaves, Siren sees and captures him.

As Trevor heads home, he resolves to never leave his apartment again ("Lizard Boy"). As he reflects on the night, he realises he's about to throw away the only chance at a genuine friendship with someone who accepts him as he is. At the same time, he accidentally finds that he has telekinetic powers when he lifts a trash can with his mind. In this moment he decides to finally accept himself as he is.

He gets a text from Cary asking to meet at the Park again ("Sculpture Park"). He suddenly discovers that he is able to communicate with Siren on the astral plane and reveals that she was actually catfishing him using Cary's phone. She threatens to kill Cary causing Trevor to rush back to the park ("Take Me to Bed").

When he arrives at the park, Siren once again asks him to help her fight against the dragon, but he refuses again, still not believing her Dragon theory. He asks her why she murdered the others and she reveals that she did so to obtain their powers because they all refused to help her.

The two get in a big fight where Siren uses a body-controlled Cary to fight Trevor. Trevor does his best to dodge all the attacks ("The Fight"). Siren finally decides to make Cary turn his knife on himself, causing Trevor to suddenly yell out his own siren song to stop her. Unfortunately, he faints due to the strain. When he wakes up, Cary offers him a hand. But before he realises something is wrong, Cary stabs him and shapeshifts back into Siren. When the real Cary comes to Trevor's rescue, Siren knocks him out.

Before Siren can obtain Trevor's Powers, giant green wings sprout from Trevor's back and he rises off the ground, wounds healed. When Siren makes a final attempt to kill Trevor, their siren songs clash and Siren gets blasted against a wall and passes out. Trevor rushes over to Cary and mourns his loss ("I Was Gonna Call You Tomorrow"). Suddenly, Cary bursts back to life, having had some of Trevor's healing ability transferred to him by his spilt blood.

As the sun rises, the two hear a rumbling in the distance. The dragons have actually come. Trevor and Cary stand hand-in-hand and Siren rises to her feet and the three share a look and charge into battle.

Cast and characters

Musical numbers

Original Cast Album 
 "Trevor's Song"- Trevor
 "Overture"- Siren
 "4th and Vine"- Cary & Trevor
 "Cary's Song"- Cary
 "A Terrible Ride"- Siren
 "Recess"- Trevor, Siren & Cary
 "Another Part of Me"- Trevor, Siren & Cary
 "Myth to Live By"- Trevor, Siren & Cary
 "Things I Worry About"*
 "The Woah Song"- Trevor, Siren & Cary
 "Truth is What Matters" (previously known as "I Might Stay")- Trevor, Siren & Cary
 "Lizard Boy"- Trevor, Siren & Cary
 "Sculpture Park"- Trevor & Cary
 "Take Me to Bed"- Trevor, Siren & Cary
 "The Fight"- Siren

Bonus tracks 
 "Don't Know Where to Go"- Trevor, Siren & Cary
 "Old Man"- Trevor, Siren & Cary

* Not included in original cast recording

Orchestration 
All instrumental accompaniment in the original production was performed by the actors themselves and was incorporated into the performance.

 Cello
 Guitar
 Ukulele
 Piano
 Kazoo
 Melodica
 Glockenspiel
 Beatbox
 Drum case

Awards and nominations

References 

American musicals
2015 musicals
LGBT-related musicals